Sambava District is a district in northern Madagascar. It is a part of Sava Region and borders the districts of Antalaha to the south, Andapa to the south-west, Ambilobe to the north-west and Iharana to the north.

Communes
The district is further divided into 25 communes:

 Ambatoafo
 Amboangibe
 Ambodiampana
 Ambodivoara
 Ambohimalaza
 Ambohimitsinjo
 Analamaho
 Andrahanjo
 Andratamarina
 Anjangoveratra
 Anjialava
 Anjinjaomby
 Antindra
 Antsahambaharo
 Antsahavaribe
 Bemanevika
 Bevonotra
 Farahalana
 Maroambiny
 Marogaona
 Marojala
 Morafeno
 Nosiarina
 Sambava
 Tanambao Daoud

References and notes

Districts of Sava Region